Kilmersdon Road Quarry is a 0.43 hectare geological Site of Special Scientific Interest between the village of Haydon and the town of Radstock, Bath and North East Somerset, notified in 1954.

This is a key Lias locality spanning much of the Hettangian, Sinemurian and Pliensbachian stages.

References

Sites of Special Scientific Interest in Avon
Sites of Special Scientific Interest notified in 1954
Quarries in Somerset